Deltoclita is a genus of South American crab spiders that was first described by Eugène Louis Simon in 1887.  it contains three species, found in Peru and Brazil: D. bioculata, D. rubra, and D. rubripes.

See also
 List of Thomisidae species

References

Further reading

Araneomorphae genera
Spiders of South America
Thomisidae